David Gawen Champernowne,  (9 July 1912 – 19 August 2000) was an English economist and mathematician.

Champernowne was the only child of Francis Gawayne Champernowne (1866–1921), M.A. (Oxon.), a barrister and bursar of Keble College, Oxford, and his wife Isabel Mary, daughter of George Rashleigh, of Riseley, Horton Kirby, Kent. The Champernowne family were landed gentry, of Dartington, Devon; Francis Gawayne Champernowne was a grandson of Arthur Champernowne (1767–1819), M.P. for Saltash in 1806, who, born to Rev. Richard Harington, second son of Sir James Harington, 6th Baronet, had taken his maternal grandfather's name on inheriting his estates.

Champernowne was educated at Winchester and King's College, Cambridge, where he was a contemporary and friend of Alan Turing. After academic work there and at the London School of Economics, he was drafted into the statistical section of the prime minister's office at the beginning of the Second World War to supply quantitative information to help Winston Churchill make decisions; then, in 1941, he moved on to become a programme director in the Ministry of Aircraft Production.

He was a Fellow of Nuffield College, Oxford, Director of the Oxford Institute of Statistics during 1945–1948, and Professor of Statistical Economics at the University of Oxford (1948–1959), and Professor of Economics and Statistics at the University of Cambridge (1970–2000).

He published work on what is now called the Champernowne constant in 1933, whilst still an undergraduate at Cambridge. In 1948, working with his old college friend Alan Turing, he helped develop one of the first chess-playing computer programs, Turochamp. The book for which he is most renowned, synthesising a life's work, Economic Inequality and Income Distribution (Cambridge University Press), was published in 1998.

His co-editors at the Economic Journal found him to be "modest, quirky and humorous".

His grave is at the new church at Dartington in Devon, built by his family in the 1870s to replace the ancient church at Dartington Hall, the family seat.

See also
 Champernowne distribution
 Harington baronets

References

External links
 Frank A. Cowell, "Champernowne, David Gawen" in Oxford Dictionary of National Biography 
 

1912 births
2000 deaths
People educated at Winchester College
Alumni of the London School of Economics
Alumni of King's College, Cambridge
English statisticians
Fellows of King's College, Cambridge
Fellows of Nuffield College, Oxford
Fellows of Trinity College, Cambridge
Fellows of the British Academy
Alan Turing
20th-century English mathematicians
20th-century  British  economists